The Krion Conquest, known in Japan as , or more simply , is a side-scrolling action-adventure video game for the Nintendo Entertainment System, developed by Vic Tokai in 1990. Later, Genki Mobile ported the game to Japanese mobile phones.

Gameplay
Players control a wand-wielding character that fires different types of projectiles based on the wand type the player has selected. The wand selection is signaled by the changes in the player's outfit color. The powers included are the normal shot (red outfit), the phoenix ability (pink outfit), the freeze shot (blue outfit), the bouncing ball shot (green outfit), the shield ability (orange outfit), and the broom ability (purple outfit). The game play resembles Capcom's Mega Man series, while the cutscenes resemble the ones in Tecmo's NES version of Ninja Gaiden.

However, unlike the first three Mega Man titles, The Krion Conquest allows players to shoot directly upward, crouch to dodge enemies and projectiles, and charge attacks. (This action was later incorporated in Mega Man 4 and most of the later Mega Man titles that feature the charging "Mega Buster".)

Plot

Story
The following plot summary is translated from the mobile version's website:

Characters
 (known outside Japan as Francesca): A witch that was summoned from a place full of demons. To save the world, she takes 6 magic abilities along with her and fights against the robot army corps, the Akudama Empire.
: The boy who summoned Doropie to fight against the Akudama Empire. Unlike Doropie, Kagemaru didn't have an official name in the North American version.
: The master of the Akudama Empire robot army corps and the one responsible for the declaration of war against the whole world. She is closely connected with Doropie. Like Kagemaru, no official name was given to her in the North American version.

Development and release
According to its designer, the development of the Magical Kids Doropie project took approximately 10 months to finish. The title was originally planned to be a licensed game based on the 1986 anime The Wonderful Wizard of Oz. However, the anime's copyrights for Japan were held by TV Tokyo, so the designers were unable to use it. They decided to develop their own basic design, which ultimately became Doropie. The name Doropie is a transliteration (or gairaigo) of Dorothy of The Wonderful Wizard of Oz anime. The rest of the Doropie design did not contain any other references to Dorothy or Oz.

Doropie's design, however, exhibited one unusual feature: the lack of eyelashes. Even though drawing eyelashes is typically used as a primary form of expression for anime-style female characters, the character designer tried to make it cute without symbolic parts. According to the main designer, her witch costume with a magical broom was the heroine's oldest design used in arcade and home video games of that time. Some developers had an opinion that "NES is for boys" and objected to having a girl as the protagonist of the game. The rest of the game's staff told the character designer that most video games during its release had male characters as protagonists because players couldn't relate to female protagonists as playable characters.

Due to the limited memory capacity of the cartridge, as well as hardware and technical problems, the final stage was cut short. It also prevented one of the designers from making magic abilities more useful in attack, defense, and movements. For instance, the "Freeze" ability was originally planned to allow players to create footholds and platforms out of enemies, while the "Shield" ability was originally planned to allow players to lay it out and allow the character to move downward.

Release 
The game was released in Japan for the Famicom on December 14, 1990.

The North American version of this game, The Krion Conquest, excluded some features from its Japanese version, Magical Kids Doropie. Due to the perceived popularity of difficult video games in North America, Vic Tokai removed the "continue" feature. The most obvious difference between the original Japanese release and the North American version is the removal of every cutscene except the slightly modified introduction sequence and several redrawn in-game graphic elements. No official English names were given to other characters. The circled hexagram (resembling the Star of David) at the end of each stage in the Japanese version was removed in the North American version because Nintendo of America did not allow religious content in video games at the time.

A sequel was planned, but Nintendo had just released the SNES. The new developer kit was too expensive for the designers to use to create the sequel.

Fourteen years later, Genki Mobile released the mobile phone version on January 14, 2004 exclusively in Japan through the Vodafone service. Its difficulty from the original was altered in the mobile phone version, allowing players who found the original too difficult to easily beat the mobile phone version. Other differences from the NES version included the shrinking of several graphics to fit the small screens of mobile phones and the introduction of two new modes: "Easy" and "Upload".

Reception
Famitsu gave it a score of 23 out of 40.

1up.com noted the similarities to Mega Man, but stated that it wasn't as fun.

References

External links
Official Genki Mobile webpage 

Fan site with developer's interview 

1990 video games
Mobile games
Nintendo Entertainment System games
Platform games
Science fiction video games
Side-scrolling video games
Single-player video games
Vic Tokai games
Video games developed in Japan
Video games featuring female protagonists
Video games scored by Masaki Kase
Video games set in the 1990s